Altenstadt is a district of Feldkirch, a city in the western Austrian state of Vorarlberg. In Altenstadt is the biggest and most important school of Feldkirch. The church was removed in the 1960s. Next to the church is a big abbey. In the East of Altenstadt is the 751m high hill Amberg.

See also
 List of cities and towns in Austria

Feldkirch, Vorarlberg